Nediljko Labrović (born 10 October 1999) is a Croatian professional footballer who plays as a goalkeeper for HNK Rijeka in the Croatian First Football League.

Club career
On 9 June 2021, Labrović signed a four-year contract with Rijeka where he was set to replace the outgoing Ivan Nevistić. On 17 July, he made his debut for the club as the starting goalkeeper on the opening matchday of the domestic league in a 2–0 away win over Gorica. Five days later, he made his European debut in the 2–0 win over Gżira United in the first leg of the second round of the UEFA Europa Conference League.

International career
On 14 February 2018, Labrović made his debut for the Croatia national under-20 team playing as a starter in the friendly match against Belarus, which was won 3–1.

Labrović was called up by the senior Croatia side for the Nations League fixtures against Austria on 3 June 2022, France on 6 and 13 June 2022, and Denmark on 10 June 2022. On 31 October 2022, Labrović was named in the preliminary 34-man squad for the 2022 FIFA World Cup, but did not make the final 26.

References

External links
 

1999 births
Living people
Footballers from Split, Croatia
Association football goalkeepers
Croatian footballers
Croatia youth international footballers
NK Junak Sinj players
HNK Šibenik players
HNK Rijeka players
First Football League (Croatia) players
Croatian Football League players